The 221st Separate Communications Brigade is a signals brigade in the Kazakh Ground Forces. It is currently located near Taraz, Jambyl Oblast.

History

Early years 
The unit was formed in 1994 by a directive of the Minister of Defense General Sagadat Nurmagambetov in the form of a separate communications battalion with the main operational task to provide communications to the command post of the defense department. The first place of its permanent deployment was the village of Burundai near Almaty.  A year later, the battalion changed its place of deployment as it was decided to transfer it to the village of Kirov, also near Almaty.

Regiment 
By directive of the Minister of Defense, the battalion was transformed into a separate regiment, and then, in 2000, it was redeployed from the suburbs of Almaty to Taraz, and it became part of the troops of the Southern Military District (now the Regional Command "South"). The regiment’s personnel had a hard time: the soldiers lived in tents, ate in field kitchens, military equipment and weapons were stored on open-air sites, the officers’ working day and contractors was irregular.

Commanders 

 Major Vladimir Shikhalev
 Major Meiram Khamzin
 Lieutenant Colonel Bolat Satylganov
 Lieutenant Colonel Alexei Kalizhanov (May 2007)

References 

Military units and formations established in 1993
Military units and formations of Kazakhstan
Military communications units and formations